Niels Vorenhout (born March 17, 1980) is a former Dutch basketball player and coach.

Coaching career
In May 2013 Vorenhout became head coach of his former club, Maxxcom BSW from Weert. In 2015, his contract expired.

References

1980 births
Living people
Dutch men's basketball players
Dutch basketball coaches
Dutch Basketball League players
Small forwards
People from Leek, Netherlands
Donar (basketball club) players
BSW (basketball club) players
Den Helder Kings players
BS Weert coaches
Sportspeople from Groningen (province)